, is one of the original 40 throws of Judo as developed by Jigoro Kano. It belongs to the second group, Dai Nikyo, of the traditional throwing list, Gokyo (no waza), of Kodokan Judo. It is also part of the current 67 Throws of Kodokan Judo. It is classified as a foot technique, Ashi-waza. Danzan-ryū's Soto Gama is a variant of Kosoto Gari.

Further reading

External links

Judo technique
Throw (grappling)